Jerry Hahn (born September 21, 1940, Alma, Nebraska) is an American jazz guitarist.

Hahn studied at Wichita State University, then moved to San Francisco in 1962, where he played with John Handy (1964–66). He toured with the 5th Dimension in 1968 and worked with Gary Burton from 1968–69. In addition to recording his own album in 1967, he led the Jerry Hahn Brotherhood, a country-blues jazz-rock ensemble, in 1970. In 1972, Hahn appeared as a session musician on "Run That Body Down" and "Armistice Day", two tracks from Paul Simon, the singer-songwriter's eponymous solo album. Later in the decade he became a teacher at Wichita State and performed less until 1986, when he moved to Portland, Oregon. He played locally and taught at Portland State University.  The Jerry Hahn Method for Jazz Guitar was published by Mel Bay Publications in 2003.

Discography
 Ara-Be-In (Changes, 1967)
 The Jerry Hahn Brotherhood (Columbia, 1970)
 Moses (Fantasy, 1973)
 Time Changes (Enja, 1995)
 Jerry Hahn & His Quintet (Arhoolie, 1998)
 Hahn Solo (Migration, 2006)
 Jazz Hymns (Migration, 2009)
 Hahn Songs (Self-released, 2010)

With Gary Burton
 Country Roads & Other Places (RCA, 1969)
 Throb (Atlantic, 1969)
 Good Vibes (Atlantic, 1969)

With John Handy
 Recorded Live at the Monterey Jazz Festival (Columbia, 1966)
With Ginger Baker Trio

Falling of the Roof

(Atlantic Records 1996)

Track #4

References
 Scott Yanow, [ Jerry Hahn] at Allmusic

1940 births
Living people
People from Alma, Nebraska
American jazz guitarists
Guitarists from Nebraska
20th-century American guitarists
Jazz musicians from Nebraska
Arhoolie Records artists
Wichita State University alumni